Annerösli Zryd (born 3 May 1949 in Adelboden, Canton of Bern) is a Swiss alpine skier and world champion. She competed in three events at the 1968 Winter Olympics.

Zryd won a gold medal at the 1970 World Championships in Val Gardena, winning the Downhill event.

References

1949 births
Living people
People from Frutigen-Niedersimmental District
Swiss female alpine skiers
Olympic alpine skiers of Switzerland
Alpine skiers at the 1968 Winter Olympics
Sportspeople from the canton of Bern
20th-century Swiss women